McGuigan is a Gaelic surname of Irish origin. Notable people with the surname include:

Andy McGuigan, Scottish soccer player
Barry McGuigan, British/Irish boxer and world Featherweight champion
Barry McGuigan World Championship Boxing, a licensed video game featuring him.
Brian McGuigan, Irish Gaelic football player
Doug McGuigan, Scottish-South African golfer
Eugene McGuigan, American athletic director of Duquesne University
Frank McGuigan, Irish Gaelic football player
Frank Joseph McGuigan, American psychologist
James Charles McGuigan, Canadian prelate of the Roman Catholic Church
Jim McGuigan, Canadian politician
John McGuigan (born 1932), Scottish footballer
Paddy McGuigan, Irish musician
Pat McGuigan, Irish singer
Paul McGuigan (musician), English musician and founder member of Oasis
Paul McGuigan (filmmaker), Scottish film director
Philip McGuigan, Irish politician
Rupert McGuigan, English Private Secretary to The Princess Royal
Tom McGuigan (1921–2013), New Zealand politician
Tommy McGuigan, Irish Gaelic football player
William McGuigan, Canadian mayor of Vancouver, British Columbia

References